The Empathic Movement (Italian: La Scuola Empatica / Empatismo) is a literary, artistic, philosophical and cultural movement born in the South of Italy in 2020 within the 'New Cultural Triangle of Ancient Cilento': Omignano - "The Aphorisms Village", Salento - "The Poetry Village", Vallo della Lucania - "Seat of Contemporary Arts Centre".

Description 
The symbolic myth of the movement, is called Unus: a semi unknown god (son of Zeus) representing the Total Artist killed, torn to pieces and thrown into the Alento (Campania) river by his brothers, determining the old separation of the Arts.

Menotti Lerro asked several noted artists to sign the “Empathic Manifesto”, to join in their peculiar expression of the “Arts” in a less individualistic way. They then started to help create a new cultural pole in Southern Italy, giving life first to the “Contemporary Arts Centre” in the Cilento area, which has invented "The Poetry Village", "The Aphorisms Village", "The Village of love", and The Cilento Poetry Prize,  giving light to new territory in terms of culture. 
The decentralization of culture gives voice to the silent masses of Cilento especially the peasant ones in the mountains, with a peculiar emphasis on intense and genuine emotion and feelings to share with others through Arts, refusing individualism, social exclusion, excesses of competition among artists and also rejecting the large phenomenon of plagiarism mainly due to the mass media and internet in particular.

The Empathic School was the third School born in the Province of Salerno, as stressed by the Soprintendenza of Salerno e Avellino in 2021. The previous two were the Eleatic School and Schola Medica Salernitana.

Some of the members who signed up include: Menotti Lerro founder of the Empathic movement, Antonello Pelliccia co-editor with Menotti Lerro of the New Manifesto of Arts, Giacomo Rizzolatti, Dacia Maraini, Maurizio Cucchi, Milo de Angelis, Giampiero Neri, Franco Loi, Roberto Carifi, Najwan Darwish, Giuseppe Gentile, Franco Mussida, Valerio Magrelli, Gino Finizio, Tiziano Rossi, Lidia Vianu, Maria Mazziotti Gillan, Giorgio Bàrberi Squarotti, Remo Bodei, Alessandro Serpieri, Davide Rondoni, Elena Paruolo, Gian Mario Villalta, Maria Teresa Chialant, Diego De Silva, Franco Arminio, Vivian Lamarque, Umberto Curi, Maria Rita Parsi, Omar Galliani, Raffaele Nigro, Tomaso Kemeny, Luigi Leuzzi, Angelo Ghilardi, Bernardo Lanzetti, Massimo Bacigalupo, Alessandro Quasimodo.

Bibliography 
Francesco D'Episcopo, Giuseppe Lauriello, Menotti Lerro, Luigi Leuzzi, Antonello Pelliccia, "Empatia, Essenza ed Esperienza", in "Riscontri" (Magazine), pp. 11-82. Anno XLIV - N.2 Maggio-Agosto 2022, edited by Ettore Barra. ISSN: 0392-5080, 
 
Menotti Lerro, Antonello Pelliccia, New Manifesto of Arts (Zona: 2020) 
Menotti Lerro, La scuola Empatica: movimento letterario-artistico-filosofico e culturale sorto in Italia nel 2020 (Ladolfi: 2020) 
Francesco D'Episcopo, "Nuovo Manifesto sulle Arti", in Menotti Lerro, Tra Drammaturgia e Narrativa (Genesi: 2019), pp. 125–136. 
"Nuovo Manifesto sulle Arti" in Annali Storici di Principato Citra, a. XVII n. 1-2, 2019, pp. 318–326. 
Marius Chelaru on "Poezia" Revista de cultura poetica, Anul XXVI, nr. 1 (95) / Primavera 2021.

Further reading 
Empatismo/Scuola Empatica: Movimento Letterario-Artistico-Filosofico e culturale sorto in Italia nel 2020, ISSN: 0392-5080
By Carlo Di Legge on Nuovo Manifesto sulle Arti
Davide Speranza, on Il Mattino, 09 August 2022, p. 28.
Ste. Mar., on Il Mattino, 26 January 2023, "Il percorso di Menotti Lerro, da Parmenide all'Empatismo".

References

External links 
 The Three Schools of Salerno Province: Scuola Empatica, Scuola Eleatica, Scuola Medica Salernitana
 European Heritage Days
 Giornate Europee del Patrimonio - Empatismo

Art movements
Avant-garde art
Italian art movements
Modern art
European art
European literature
European music
Literary genres
Empathism
Theories of aesthetics
Italian literature
Italian literary movements
Critical thinking
Empathism The
Progress
Italian poetry